The 2015–16 Arkansas Razorbacks women's basketball team represented the University of Arkansas in the 2015–16 college basketball season. The Razorbacks, led by second-year head coach Jimmy Dykes, play their games at Bud Walton Arena and were members of the Southeastern Conference. They finished the season 12–18, 7–9 in SEC play to finish in tenth place. They lost in the second round of the SEC women's tournament to Tennessee.

Roster

Schedule

|-
!colspan=9 style="background:#C41E3A; color:#FFFFFF;"| Exhibition

|-
!colspan=9 style="background:#C41E3A; color:#FFFFFF;"| Non-conference regular season

|-
!colspan=9 style="background:#C41E3A; color:#FFFFFF;"| SEC regular season

|-
!colspan=9 style="background:#C41E3A;"| SEC Women's Tournament

Rankings
2015–16 NCAA Division I women's basketball rankings

See also
2015–16 Arkansas Razorbacks men's basketball team

References

Arkansas
Arkansas Razorbacks women's basketball seasons
Arkansas Razor
Arkansas Razor